The men's 200 metres event  at the 1990 European Athletics Indoor Championships was held in Kelvin Hall on 3 and 4 March.

Medalists

Results

Heats
First 2 from each heat (Q) qualified directly for the semifinals.

Semifinals
First 2 from each semifinal (Q) and the next 1 fastest (q) qualified for the final.

Final

References

Video of the final

200 metres at the European Athletics Indoor Championships
200